The Dasyuridae are a family of marsupials native to Australia and New Guinea, including 71 extant species divided into 17 genera. Many are small and mouse-like or shrew-like, giving some of them the name marsupial mice or marsupial shrews, but the group also includes the cat-sized quolls, as well as the Tasmanian devil. They are found in a wide range of habitats, including grassland, underground, forests, and mountains, and some species are arboreal or semiaquatic. The Dasyuridae are often called the 'marsupial carnivores', as most members of the family are insectivores.

Characteristics
Most dasyurids are roughly the size of mice, but a few species are much larger. The smaller dasyurids typically resemble shrews or mice in appearance, with long tails and narrow, pointed noses. The larger species bear a resemblance to such placental carnivores as mongooses or mustelids.

Many features of dasyurids are considered primitive; that is, they resemble the features of the earliest marsupials, from which other species, such as kangaroos and bandicoots, later diverged. For example, all of the toes in dasyurids are separate, whereas in many other marsupials, the second and third toes are fused. Similarly, many species lack a full marsupial pouch, instead having a simple fold of skin surrounding the teats to provide some protection to the developing young. The dentition of dasyurids is also considered primitive, and differs from that of other marsupials, with a dental formula of: . Their dentition is similar to many carnivores, characterized by bladelike incisors, large, sharp canines, and upper molars modified with large, sharp cusps.

Dasyurids are primarily insectivorous, but they will also eat small lizards, fruit, and flowers. One of the few exceptions to this rule is the Tasmanian devil, which subsists mainly on vertebrate carrion. They have relatively simple digestive tracts, as is typical of insectivores and other carnivores.

Gestation lasts from 12–16 days, and results in the birth of from two to 12 young, depending on species. Smaller species typically breed at least twice a year, while the larger forms tend to breed just once. The length of lactation reflects this, with young dunnarts, for example, being weaned after 60–70 days, but young quolls only after 8–9 months. Most dasyurid species are sexually mature at one year of age, but, again, the quolls and Tasmanian devil, being larger, take longer to mature and do not reach full adulthood for about two years.

Adult dasyurids are typically solitary, or travel in small groups of two to three individuals.

Classification

The listing for extant species is based on The Third edition of Wilson & Reeder's Mammal Species of the World (2005), except where the Mammal Diversity Database and IUCN agree on a change.
 Family Dasyuridae
 Genus Ganbulanyi†
 Genus Glaucodon†
 Subfamily Barinyainae†
 Genus Barinya†
 Subfamily Dasyurinae
 Tribe Dasyurini
 Genus Dasycercus
 Brush-tailed mulgara, Dasycercus blythi
 Crest-tailed mulgara, Dasycercus cristicauda
 Genus Dasykaluta
 Little red kaluta, Dasykaluta rosamondae
 Genus Dasyuroides
 Kowari, Dasyuroides byrnei
 Genus Dasyurus: quolls
 New Guinean quoll, Dasyurus albopunctatus
 Western quoll, Dasyurus geoffroii
 Northern quoll, Dasyurus hallucatus
 Tiger quoll, Dasyurus maculatus
 Bronze quoll, Dasyurus spartacus
 Eastern quoll, Dasyurus viverrinus
 Genus Myoictis
 Woolley's three-striped dasyure, Myoictis leucera
 Three-striped dasyure, Myoictis melas
 Wallace's dasyure, Myoictis wallacii
 Tate's three-striped dasyure, Myoictis wavicus
 Genus Neophascogale
 Speckled dasyure, Neophascogale lorentzi
 Genus Parantechinus
 Dibbler, Parantechinus apicalis
 Genus Phascolosorex
 Red-bellied marsupial shrew, Phascolosorex doriae
 Narrow-striped marsupial shrew, Phascolosorex dorsalis
 Genus Pseudantechinus
 Sandstone false antechinus, Pseudantechinus bilarni
 Fat-tailed false antechinus, Pseudantechinus macdonnellensis
 Alexandria false antechinus, Pseudantechinus mimulus
 Ningbing false antechinus, Pseudantechinus ningbing
 Rory Cooper's false antechinus, Pseudantechinus roryi
 Woolley's false antechinus, Pseudantechinus woolleyae
 Genus Sarcophilus
 Tasmanian devil, Sarcophilus harrisii
 Tribe Phascogalini
 Genus Antechinus
 Tropical antechinus, Antechinus adustus
 Agile antechinus, Antechinus agilis
 Fawn antechinus, Antechinus bellus
 Yellow-footed antechinus, Antechinus flavipes
 Atherton antechinus, Antechinus godmani
 Cinnamon antechinus, Antechinus leo
 Swamp antechinus, Antechinus minimus
 Brown antechinus, Antechinus stuartii
 Subtropical antechinus, Antechinus subtropicus
 Tasmanian dusky antechinus, Antechinus swainsonii
Genus Murexia
 Habbema dasyure, Miurexia habbema
Short-furred dasyure, Murexia longicaudata
Black-tailed dasyure, Murexia melanurus
Long-nosed dasyure, Murexia naso
Broad-striped dasyure, Murexia rothschildi
 Genus Phascogale
 Red-tailed phascogale, Phascogale calura
 Northern brush-tailed phascogale, Phascogale pirata
 Brush-tailed phascogale, Phascogale tapoatafa
Subfamily Sminthopsinae
 Tribe Planigalini
 Genus Planigale
 Paucident planigale, Planigale gilesi
 Long-tailed planigale, Planigale ingrami
 Common planigale, Planigale maculata
 New Guinean planigale, Planigale novaeguineae
 Narrow-nosed planigale, Planigale tenuirostris
Tribe Sminthopsini
 Genus Antechinomys
 Kultarr, Antechinomys laniger
 Genus Ningaui
 Wongai ningaui, Ningaui ridei
 Pilbara ningaui, Ningaui timealeyi
 Southern ningaui, Ningaui yvonnae
 Genus Sminthopsis
 †S. floravillensis Archer, 1982
 S. crassicaudata species-group
 Fat-tailed dunnart, Sminthopsis crassicaudata
 S. macroura species-group
 Kakadu dunnart, Sminthopsis bindi
 Carpentarian dunnart, Sminthopsis butleri
 Julia Creek dunnart, Sminthopsis douglasi
 Stripe-faced dunnart, Sminthopsis macroura
 Red-cheeked dunnart, Sminthopsis virginiae
 S. granulipes species-group
 White-tailed dunnart, Sminthopsis granulipes
 S. griseoventer species-group
 Grey-bellied dunnart, Sminthopsis griseoventer
 S. longicaudata species-group
 Long-tailed dunnart, Sminthopsis longicaudata
 S. murina species-group
 Chestnut dunnart, Sminthopsis archeri
 Little long-tailed dunnart, Sminthopsis dolichura
 Sooty dunnart, Sminthopsis fulginosus
 Gilbert's dunnart, Sminthopsis gilberti
 White-footed dunnart, Sminthopsis leucopus
 Slender-tailed dunnart, Sminthopsis murina
 S. psammophila species-group
 Hairy-footed dunnart, Sminthopsis hirtipes
 Ooldea dunnart, Sminthopsis ooldea
 Sandhill dunnart, Sminthopsis psammophila
 Lesser hairy-footed dunnart, Sminthopsis youngsoni

References

External links

Dasyuromorphs
Mammal families